The 2021 A-League Grand Final was the 16th A-League Grand Final, the championship-deciding match of the Australian A-League and the culmination of the 2020–21 season. The match was played between season premiers Melbourne City and the second-placed team and championship holders Sydney FC on 27 June 2021 at AAMI Park in Melbourne.

Melbourne City won their first championship by beating Sydney 3–1.

Teams
In the following table, finals until 2004 were in the National Soccer League era, since 2006 were in the A-League era.

Route to the final

The 2020–21 season was the league's sixteenth since its inception in 2005, and the 44th season of top-flight association football in Australia. Twelve teams competed in the regular season, with each team playing a total of 26 matches, resulting in an uneven fixture that involved some clubs meeting three times and others meeting only twice. The top six teams qualified for the finals series, which were played in a straight-knockout format, with the top two teams earning an automatic place in the semi-finals and the bottom four teams playing off in elimination finals. The two winners of the semi-finals met in the grand final. Melbourne City and Sydney FC qualified for the semi-finals by virtue of finishing first and second respectively, whilst Central Coast Mariners (third) met Macarthur FC (sixth) in the first elimination final and Brisbane Roar (fourth) took on Adelaide United (fifth) in the second elimination final. Macarthur defeated Central Coast Mariners two goals to nil, both goals coming in extra time and Adelaide United defeated Brisbane Roar two goals to one. As the top-ranked team, Melbourne City were paired with and defeated Macarthur, the lowest-ranked winning team, 2–0, for their semi-final, whilst Sydney FC were victorious against Adelaide United in the other semi-final, the scoreline being 2–1.

Due to crowd restrictions imposed as a result of the COVID-19 pandemic in Victoria, Melbourne City's home semi-final was moved to Netstrata Jubilee Stadium in New South Wales.

Pre-match

Venue 
The Grand Final was held at AAMI Park, Melbourne, Victoria, the home ground of Melbourne City. It was the second Grand Final hosted at the venue, after 2015.

Attendance 
Due to COVID-19 restrictions, the stadium was limited to 50% capacity. Tickets for the game were sold out, resulting in a final attendance of 14,017 spectators. Due to a COVID-19 lockdown in Sydney, many travelling fans for the away team were unable to attend the match.

Broadcasting
The Grand Final was broadcast throughout Australia live on Fox Sports and streamed for free on Kayo Sports through the Kayo Freebies initiative. This was also the last A-League match broadcast on Fox Sports after a sixteen year association with the broadcaster, with the A-League moving to Network 10 and Paramount+. In the United States, the Grand Final was shown on ESPN+.

Match

Summary
Despite early dominance from Melbourne City, they slipped to an early disadvantage after Sydney FC's Kosta Barbarouses hit a powerful effort past City goalkeeper Thomas Glover. Shortly after this goal, the eventual Joe Marston medalist Nathaniel Atkinson scored for City to put the teams level at 1–1. In the 35th minute of the match, Sydney midfielder Luke Brattan was sent off after accumulating two yellow cards, allowing Melbourne to continue to dominate after this point in the match. They eventually won the game 3–1 thanks to further goals from captain Scott Jamieson and Scott Galloway, and claimed their first A-League championship.

Details

Statistics

Notes

References 

2020–21 A-League season
A-League Men Grand Finals
Soccer in Melbourne
Sydney FC matches
Melbourne City FC matches